Save Yourself is the debut album by Scottish pop rock band Speedway. It reached No. 42 on the UK Albums Chart.

Track listing

References

2004 debut albums
Speedway (band) albums
Innocent Records albums